The 1962 Nevada gubernatorial election occurred on November 6, 1962. Incumbent Democrat Grant Sawyer ran successfully for re-election to a second term as Governor of Nevada, defeating Republican nominee in Las Vegas mayor Oran K. Gragson.

Results

References

1966
Nevada
Gubernatorial
November 1962 events in the United States